Cupica Airport  is an airport serving the northern Solano Bay area on the Pacific coast of Colombia's Chocó Department. The runway parallels the shoreline of the bay.

See also

Transport in Colombia
List of airports in Colombia

References

External links
OpenStreetMap - Cupica
OurAirports - Cupica
FallingRain - Cupica Airport
Google Maps - Cupica

Airports in Colombia